The Baur River is a river in India in the lower Himalayan regions crossing Kotabagh and Bajauniyahaldu, and finally reaching Gularbhoj Dam. It  is economically important for its neighbouring villages, e.g. Degaon, Bajauniyahaldu, Musabangar. It provides water supply for the whole season for irrigation.

The fact that it is surrounded by dense forest makes it widely diverse in its fauna. A variety of fish are found throughout the year such as Rohu and Catla. Some common species of crabs make the river a rich source of food.

Rivers of Uttarakhand
Rivers of India